The 2000–01 Ukrainian Second League was the tenth season of 3rd level professional football in Ukraine.

The competitions were divided into three groups according to geographical location in the country – A is western Ukraine, B is southern Ukraine and Crimea, and C is eastern Ukraine.

The groups were won respectively by FC Polissya Zhytomyr, FC Obolon Kyiv and FC Naftovyk Okhtyrka.

Team changes

Promoted
The following team were promoted from the 2000 Ukrainian Football Amateur League:
 FC Tekhno-Tsentr Rohatyn – (debut)
 FC Frunzenets-Liha-99 Sumy – (debut, previously (17 seasons ago) played in the 1983 Soviet Second League as Frunzenets Sumy)

Also, eight more clubs were admitted additionally:
 FC Krasyliv – (debut)
 FC Sokil Zolochiv – (debut)
 FC Ternopil-Nyva-2 – (debut)
 FC Dnipro-3 Dnipropetrovsk – (debut)
 FC Cherkasy-2– (debut)
 FC Shakhtar-3 Donetsk – (debut)
 FC Metalurh-2 Mariupol – (debut)
 SSSOR-Metalurh Zaporizhzhia – (debut)
 FC Stal-2 Alchevsk– (debut)

Relegated
The following team were relegated from the 1999–2000 Ukrainian First League:
 FC Polissya Zhytomyr – (returning after an absence of 7 seasons)
 FC Naftovyk Okhtyrka – (returning after an absence of 11 seasons, previously in the 1989 Soviet tier–3 competitions)
 FC Obolon Kyiv – (returning after an absence of a season)
 FC Chornomorets-2 Odesa – (returning after an absence of 5 seasons)

Group A

Location map

Final standings

Group B

Location map

Final standings

Group C

Location map

Final standings

External links
 2000–01 Ukrainian Second League. RSSSF

Ukrainian Second League seasons
3
Ukra